Futsal Club Regensburg (FCR) is a German futsal club based in Regensburg. The first team currently plays in the Futsal-Bayernliga, which is the second tier of futsal in the German futsal league system.

Club history 
FCR is renowned for being a pioneer for the development of futsal in Germany and has arranged many futsal courses. Founded in 2011, it is the oldest futsal club in Bavaria and a founding member of the first Bavarian Futsal League. The club started as a university team and reached the final of the 2013 German Futsal University Championships, where they lost 9-3 to former DFB Futsal Cup winners Muenster. In the 2015-16 Bayernliga season, FCR qualified for the promotion playoffs to the Futsal-Regionalliga Süd, but were eliminated in a two-legged semi-final encounter by eventual winners SSV Jahn Regensburg. The first team was dissolved at the end of the 2015–16 season after many players had left the club to nearby rivals SSV Jahn Regensburg and TV Wackersdorf. The club restarted in the Futsal-Bezirksliga for the 2016-17 season and finished first in their division to qualify for the division playoff final, where they were beaten by SV Schwarzhofen.

Honours 

German Futsal University Championships:
Runners-up (1): 2013
Promotion playoffs to the Futsal-Regionalliga Süd:
Semi-final: 2016

References

External links
 Official website 
 Bavarian Football Association 
 Futsal-Bayernliga on Fussball.de 

Futsal clubs in Germany
Sport in Regensburg
Futsal clubs established in 2011
2011 establishments in Germany